The major aspects of Medieval Scandinavian architecture are boathouses, religious buildings (before and after Christians arrived in the area), and general buildings (both in cities and outside of them).

Boating houses
Boathouses are the buildings used to hold Viking Ships during the winter and any time they could not sail. They were usually built slightly back from the waterline. They were dug into the ground as well as built up. They had to be extremely long because the Viking Ships could be 25 meters long or longer. The walls were made of wood with stones piled up at the base. Each held one ship only, but many boathouses could be built next to each other if multiple ships had to be housed.

Military buildings

Viking ring fortress 
Trelleborg is a collective name for six Viking Age circular forts, located in Denmark and the southern part of modern Sweden. Five of them have been dated to the reign of the Harold Bluetooth of Denmark (died 986). All trelleborgs have a strictly circular shape. This structure may also be (partially) encircled by an advanced rampart but this part of the structure is not necessarily circular.

Religious buildings

Ritual houses
Ritual Houses were the religious buildings before Christians came to Scandinavia. Early ritual houses were simple wooden buildings not much different from other buildings. Ritual houses were a place to display the weapons of defeated enemies. But as time went on, they got more complex. They often had multi-layer roofs with decorations on the peaks. The entrances were also ornamented with decorated columns. Later stave churches were likely inspired by them. Rituals (slaughtered and burnt animal sacrifices) took place outside, so the majority of the decorations were on the outside.

Stave churches
Stave churches were used for Christian gatherings in the Norse region after the Christianization of Scandinavia. The roofs were often multi-layered, and they usually had a tower or spire in the middle of the highest layer of the roof. They were built of wood, and had stone walls around the base. From the outside, they look like more complex forms of the Ritual Houses. But the inside was highly decorated with intricate designs. Most of these designs depict Jesus, a cross, or the disciples.

General buildings

Countryside
These buildings were built of wood, usually logs similar to “Lincoln Logs" or log - cabin style. The roofs were covered in dirt to keep the heat inside the house, and grass was planted in the dirt on the roof to keep it from eroding away. These buildings were for farming the rough steep fjords. The buildings for farms were split into two parts, Innhus and Uthus. The Innhus was for food storage, sleeping and living. The Uthus were the buildings for animals, tools and animal fodder (animal food), in other words, the Uthus were the barns and silos.

Viking Longhouse
In much of the Norse region, the longhouses were built around wooden frames on simple stone footings. Walls were constructed of planks, of logs, or of wattle and daub.

Icelandic turf houses

The common Icelandic turf house would have a large foundation made of flat stones; upon this was built a wooden frame which would hold the load of the turf. The turf would then be fitted around the frame in blocks often with a second layer, or in the more fashionable herringbone style. The only external wood would be the doorway which would often be decorative; the doorway would lead into the hall which would commonly have a great fire. Another interesting aspect of the Icelandic turf house was the introduction of attached toilets, which were communal, and the act of going to the attached toilet was often done in large groups. The floor of a turf house could be covered with wood, stone or earth depending on the purpose of the building. They also had a fireplace that would be in the center of the house heating and lighting the whole house

Oslo 

Until 1624, Oslo was like any other Norse town (many wooden buildings together used for varying purposes), but in 1624, a fire burned down all of Oslo. Because of the fires, the King Christian IV moved Oslo west and ordered that all buildings in the city be built of stone or brick to prevent fires. Also to prevent fires, the streets were wide and met at right angles. After a time, the King allowed the people to “build half-timbered structures," which has the timber frame visible on both the inside and the outside of the building.

See also 

 Heathen hofs

References

External links
The stave churches in Norway

Scandinavian architecture
Medieval architecture
Viking art